The Country Boy is a lost 1915 American comedy silent film directed by Frederick A. Thomson based upon a play by Edgar Selwyn. The film stars Marshall Neilan, Florence Dagmar, Dorothy Green, Loyola O'Connor, Mrs. Lewis McCord, and Horace B. Carpenter. The film was released on February 18, 1915, by Paramount Pictures.

Plot

Cast 
Marshall Neilan as Tom Wilson 
Florence Dagmar as Jane Belknap
Dorothy Green as Amy Leroy
Loyola O'Connor as Mrs. Wilson
Mrs. Lewis McCord as Mrs. Bannon
Horace B. Carpenter as Merkle
Edgar Lewis as Weinstein 
Ernest Joy as Judge Belknap
Tex Driscoll as Hez
Al Ernest Garcia as Jimmy Michaelson

References

External links 
 

1915 films
1910s English-language films
Silent American comedy films
1915 comedy films
Paramount Pictures films
American black-and-white films
American silent feature films
1915 lost films
Lost comedy films
Films directed by Frederick A. Thomson
1910s American films